Theasinensin F is polyphenol flavonoid found in oolong tea.

It's a deoxy derivative of theasinensin A.

References 
 
 

Flavanols
Polyphenols
Biphenyls